Luboměř is a municipality and village in the Nový Jičín District in the Moravian-Silesian Region of the Czech Republic. It has about 400 inhabitants.

Administrative parts
The village of Heltínov is an administrative part of Luboměř.

References

Villages in Nový Jičín District